Johnstone "Jock" Richardson (2 April 1899 – 28 October 1994) was a New Zealand rugby union player. A loose forward, Richardson represented Otago and Southland at a provincial level, and was a member of the New Zealand national side, the All Blacks, from 1921 to 1925.  He played 42 matches for the All Blacks, 16 of them as captain, including seven internationals.

Following the death of Wiremu Heke in 1989, Richardson was the oldest living All Black.

References

1899 births
1994 deaths
Rugby union players from Dunedin
New Zealand international rugby union players
Otago rugby union players
Southland rugby union players
Rugby union flankers